Miguel Ángel Rodríguez is a Mexican born actor and director with more than 200 credits. Among his work, he has acted in Rosalinda and Bad Cop with Damian Chapa.

Career

1970s to 1990s
One of his earliest roles was in the 1977 Rafael Villaseñor Kuri directed film,  Mil caminos tiene la muerte.
After that he acted with René Cardona and Roberto Cañedo in Cronica roja, released in 1978/1979. Also around the time, he appeared in Benjamín Argumedo el rebelde, which was directed by Mario Hernández. Around 1989 / 1990, he played the part of Det. Mike Silva in the Alfredo Zacarías directed Crime of Crimes, which also starred David Carradine.  He played the part of Javier Pérez in the 1999 film Rosalinda.

2000s
He played a gangster in the Damian Chapa directed film Bad Cop, which was released in 2009. He recently appeared in the 2016 TV series Eva La Trailera.

References

External links
 
 

Living people
Mexican male actors
Year of birth missing (living people)